Kenneth McMillan (July 2, 1932 – January 8, 1989) was an American actor.  McMillan was usually cast as gruff, hostile and unfriendly characters due to his rough image. However, he was sometimes cast in some lighter comic roles that highlighted his gentler side. He was perhaps best known as Jack Doyle in Rhoda (1977–1978), and as Baron Harkonnen in David Lynch's Dune.

Biography

Personal life
McMillan was born in Brooklyn, New York, the son of Margaret and Harry McMillan, a truck driver. 
He attended Fiorello H. LaGuardia High School of Music & Art and Performing Arts. Prior to becoming an actor, McMillan was employed at  Gimbels Department Store first as a salesman, then as a section manager, and then a floor superintendent managing three floors. At age 30, McMillan decided to pursue an acting career, and took acting lessons from Uta Hagen and Irene Dailey. He was married to Kathryn McDonald (20 June 1969 – 8 January 1989) (his death) with whom he had one child, actress Alison McMillan.

Career

McMillan made his film debut at age 41 with a small role in Sidney Lumet's police drama Serpico. The actor played a borough commander in The Taking of Pelham One Two Three, but often was cast as characters such as a cowardly small town sheriff in Tobe Hooper's 1979 TV mini-series Salem's Lot, a similar law enforcement officer in the 1987 Burt Reynolds film Malone, William Hurt's bitter paraplegic father in Eyewitness, a wily safe cracker in The Pope of Greenwich Village, and a racist fire chief in Ragtime who is memorably told off by the New York City police commissioner, James Cagney. In 1985, he played this city's newly appointed police commissioner in the short lived television crime drama Our Family Honor.

He portrayed the grotesquely obese and gleefully psychotic Baron Vladimir Harkonnen in Dune, the pathetic drunken pop of Aidan Quinn in Reckless and a sleazy high roller gambler in "The Ledge," a segment of the horror anthology film Cat's Eye. Yet he did sometimes end up on the right side of the law, playing Robert Duvall's detective partner in True Confessions and a judge who must rule whether Richard Dreyfuss has the right to die in Whose Life Is It Anyway?.

McMillan was also adept at comedy, giving performances as a baseball club manager in Blue Skies Again, Meg Ryan's corrupt security guard captain dad in Armed and Dangerous and a dotty senile veterinarian in Three Fugitives.

McMillan had a recurring role in 1977–78 as Valerie Harper's irate boss Jack Doyle on the TV sitcom Rhoda. Among the TV shows McMillan did guest spots on are Dark Shadows, Ryan's Hope, as a 53rd precinct lieutenant on Kojak, Starsky & Hutch, The Rockford Files, Moonlighting, Lou Grant, Magnum, P.I. and Murder, She Wrote.

Outside of his film and TV credits, McMillan also frequently performed on stage at the New York Shakespeare Festival. He acted in the original Broadway productions of Streamers and American Buffalo. He won an Obie for his performance in the Off-Broadway play Weekends Like Other People.

McMillan died of liver disease at age 56.

Filmography

Serpico (1973) – Charlie (uncredited)
The Taking of Pelham One Two Three (1974) – Harry – Borough Commander 
The Stepford Wives (1975) – Market Manager
Dog Day Afternoon (1975) – Commissioner (uncredited)
A Death in Canaan (1978) – Sgt. Tim Scully
Girlfriends (1978) – Cabbie
Bloodbrothers (1978) – Mikey Banion
Oliver's Story (1978) – Jamie Francis
Chilly Scenes of Winter (1979) – Pete
Salem's Lot (1979; TV) – Constable Parkins Gillespie
Hide in Plain Sight (1980) – Sam Marzetta
Little Miss Marker (1980) – Brannigan
Carny (1980) – Heavy St. John
Borderline (1980) – Malcolm Wallace
Eyewitness (1981) – Mr. Deever
True Confessions (1981) – Frank Crotty
Ragtime (1981) – Willie Conklin
Whose Life Is It Anyway? (1981) – Judge Wyler
Heartbeeps (1981) – Max
Partners (1982) – Chief Wilkins
In the Custody of Strangers (1982; TV) – Albert C. Caruso
The Clairvoyant (1982) – Detective Cullum
Blue Skies Again (1983) – Dirk
Packin' It In – Howard Estep
Reckless (1984) – John Rourke Sr
The Pope of Greenwich Village (1984) – Barney
Amadeus (1984; 2002 Director's Cut only) – Michael Schlumberg (2002 Director's Cut)
Dune (1984) – Baron Vladimir Harkonnen
Protocol (1984) – Senator Norris
Cat's Eye (1985) – Cressner
Runaway Train (1985) – Eddie MacDonald
Armed and Dangerous (1986) – Captain Clarence O'Connell
Malone (1987) – Hawkins
Three Fugitives (1989) – Horvath

References

External links
 
 
 

1932 births
1989 deaths
American male film actors
American male stage actors
American male television actors
Obie Award recipients
Male actors from New York City
People from Brooklyn
Deaths from liver disease
20th-century American male actors